Diversi-Dial, or DDial was an online chat server that was popular during the mid-1980s.  It was a specialized type of bulletin board system that allowed all callers to send lines of text to each other in real-time, often operating at 300 baud.  In some ways, it was a sociological forerunner to IRC, and was a cheap, local alternative to CompuServe chat, which was expensive and billed by the minute.  At its peak, at least 35 major DDial systems existed across the United States, many of them in large cities.  During the evening when telephone rates were low, the biggest DDial systems would link together using Telenet or PC Pursuit connections, forming regional chat networks.

History
Diversi-Dial was written by Bill Basham, a computer hobbyist who ran a company known as Diversified Software Research in Farmington Hills, Michigan.  The software was written while he was a resident of Rockford, Illinois.  Bill Basham ran a copy of the system himself in Rockford at the time.  Kim Kirkpatrick, "Hubcap" also in Rockford, ran DDial#2 and a lot of early testing was done between Bill and Kim. Another early Rockford site was owned by Dale Wishop (GOD) named "Heaven and Hell - The World that GOD Rulz Over!". The phone company had to run miles of new cable just to accommodate the additional phone lines. When "Heaven and Hell" shutdown, Dale sold some of his 1200 baud Applecat modems to Scott and Terri Johnson (Megabucks and Spender), and DDial #12 “Spenderz Never Inn” stated up in its place, running on two Apple //e computers and 12 phone lines. All of Bill's software followed the same naming scheme as "Diversi-[something]".

Organization
Customers typically paid the local DDial owner a flat rate of about $5 to $20 per month.  Open access to anonymous visitors (called nons, r0s JAMFs or m0es) was an effective hook to draw in paid registrations.  Nons typically had a five-minute connect time limit unless they were "validated" by an assistant sysop, and were shut out of the system during peak usage hours.

A typical DDial system ran on a small cluster of Apple II computers, with seven connections per computer.  In 1989, a DDial-like clone, Synergy Teleconferencing System AKA STS was developed for the IBM PC, but by this time it was outpaced by alternatives like GEnie.  By the mid-1990s, DDials had been bypassed by the Internet and IRC, although Chicago's God's Country, kept an incredibly loyal following between 1985–87 and 1989-1998. Many of its users are still close to this day. 

Many client software programs existed for BBS connections back then, but one in particular for C64 or Commodore64 was optimized just for DDial, call Eagleterm 6a.  Written by Jungle Jim (Jj), aka Jim Sanders, and released as freeware and saw widespread use among Ddialers. 
EagleTerm6a took full advantage of Commodore 64 pulse dial modem technology, heavily optimized to find the max pulse speed of the user's local phone connection, and rapid fire re-dial back in to beat the other callers when reconnecting, easily beating the newer tone dial modems just coming to market.  During peak times, the DDial system was jam packed with callers far exceeding the number of available lines, and a super fast dialer was a plus.  Later versions of Eagleterm6a were protected against reverse engineering (not de-compilable using unBlitz.)

Major DDials 
One DDial owner went on to become the founder and CEO of Honesty.com, the first web-based third-party Internet application corporation, focused on E-Commerce sites such as eBay, Amazon.com, and Yahoo! Auctions, by utilizing the knowledge gleaned from having run a social and community based computer system for a decade prior to initial popularity of the Web.   

Point Zer0 was the other long-term Chicago-area Ddial, along with Jokertown.  Other Chicago-area Ddials of Note included God's Country, Kaleidoscope, General Modem (DDial #13), Tangled Web, The Bunker (DDial #4), Cloud Nine (DDial #38), Black Magic and others.   At one period of time, the Chicago area hosted over 10 DDial or clone systems, possibly due to its relative proximity to the Rockford origins of Basham's DD #1.

ENTchat, an Internet-based DDial look-alike,  was somewhat active in the mid- to late 1990s but also went offline. 

In 2006, The Late Night BBS went online, utilizing the original DDial software running on an Apple //e, but was accessible from the Internet via telnet.  The system provided an authentic 1980s ddial experience, including the traditional 300 bit/s connection speed. Late Night BBS has since gone offline.

As of 2012, there are only two known DDial stations in operation:
 The Savage Frontier, DDial Station #28, has been modified to run under emulation and is therefore Internet accessible.  This system served the Philadelphia metropolitan area in the 1980s and 1990s, at times under other names.

 RMAC (aka Rover's Multiuser Active Conference), DDial Station #34, runs on original Apple IIe hardware with modems and has been constructed in an Internet-accessible manner.  This system served the Dallas / Fort Worth metroplex in the late 1980s.  Today, the system uses authentic DDial software with TASC/Paradise mods, and can be reached via telnet at rmac.d-dial.com.

Retro-Dial, a Linux-based chat server with the look and feel of DDial, currently has multiple stations in operation which are usually linked with each other as well as The Savage Frontier.  The home station for Retro-Dial can be reached via telnet at carriersync.com.

In late June, 2013, several members of Rockford, IL area DDials held a spontaneous reunion online, connected to each other via RMAC DDial #34.

References
 Diversi-Dial instructions and software images
 DDial Highlights
 Searchable database of old DDials and other bulletin board systems 
 Discussion group for DDial users
 The Savage Frontier
 RMAC Diversi-Dial #34
 Project Page for Mouse's DDial Emulator
 XxSwitchBladexX's Digital Dial homepage
 CarrierSync - Retro-Dial Home Page

Bulletin board system software